Scoriton is a tiny hamlet in the county of Devon, England, and the main centre of habitation of the parish of West Buckfastleigh.

Description

The hamlet is about three miles northwest of Buckfastleigh and is situated within the boundaries of Dartmoor National Park.

The hamlet consists largely of about a dozen stone-built cottages, but there are also 4 local authority houses, a farm, and a popular inn with food and accommodation, called The Tradesman's Arms. Faced with the closure of the inn in 2008, four regulars decided to buy the property and reopen it. The inn is still open and thriving as of November 2022.

The Scoriton Country Show is held annually on August Bank Holiday Monday in a field on the outskirts of the village, it is now in its 72nd year.
There is also an annual Christmas 'Ball in the Hall' which is held at the Scoriton Village Hall.

Transportation
Bus line 672 of Country Bus Devon calls at The Tradesman's Arms twice every Thursday (except for public holidays): once at 10:11 towards Buckfastleigh, Ashburton, Seale, and Newton Abbot, and once at 14:15 towards Holne, Poundsgate, Ponsworthy, Widecombe, and Buckland-in-the-Moor.

Twinning
The village is twinned with the commune of Fontaine-Henry, Calvados, France.

References

External links

Villages in Devon